Jon Keeyes (born April 5, 1969) is an American film director, producer and screenwriter. He began his career as an entertainment journalist before moving into filmmaking. His first movie American Nightmare became a cult hit and has never been out of distribution. In 2015, he began to put more of an emphasis on producing, and since 2020 has maintained an equal balance of producing notable feature films and directing actors such as John Malkovich and Antonio Banderas He is a co-founder and principal of the independent film company Highland Myst Entertainment.

Filmography
American Nightmare (2002) (producer, director, writer)
Hallow’s End (2003) (producer, director)
Suburban Nightmare (2004) (producer, director, writer)
Equilateral (2005) (producer, director)
Mad Bad (2007) (director)
Living & Dying (2007) (producer, director, writer)
Angela's Body (short) (2009) (producer, director, writer)
Fall Down Dead (2009) (producer, director)
Billy Mean Pipes (short) (2009) (director)
Butterscotch (short) (2009) (director)
From the Dark (2009) (co-producer)
Spilt Milk (2010) (co-producer)
Phobia (2012) (director)
The Mechanical Grave (short) (2012) (producer, director, writer)
Teen a Go Go: A Little Film About Rock and Roll History (2012) (co-producer)
Nightmare Box (2014) (producer, director, writer)
Odd Man Out (2014) (co-producer)
Element (2016) (director)
Jack Goes Home (2016) (co-producer)
King Cobra (2016) (co-producer)
Welcome to Willits (2016) (co-producer)
Ten (2017) (co-producer)
Alterscape (2018) (producer)
After Everything (2018) (co-producer)
Welcome the Stranger (2018) (co-producer)
The Escape of Prisoner 614 (2018) (co-producer)
The Pretenders (2018) (co-producer)
Burn (2018) (co-producer)
Crypto (2018) (co-producer)
The Harrowing (2017) (director, writer, producer)
Hooking Up (2020) (producer)
Becky (2020) (co-producer)
Rogue Hostage (2021) (director)
The Survivalist (2021) (director)
Code Name Banshee (2022) (director, producer)
The Kill Room (2023) (producer)
The Last Girl (2023) (director, producer)
Clean Up Crew (2023) (director)

Television
Inspector Mom - "The Haunted House Horror" (2007)
Throwing Stones - 6 episodes (2012)

References

External links

Highland Myst Entertainment
Director's Official Website

American film directors
American film producers
American male screenwriters
1969 births
Living people